Ojeda is a Spanish surname.

Geographical distribution
As of 2014, 22.7% of all known bearers of the surname Ojeda were residents of Argentina (frequency 1:458), 20.7% of Mexico (1:1,461), 10.4% of Venezuela (1:705), 7.7% of Paraguay (1:227), 7.1% of Chile (1:602), 6.9% of Colombia (1:1,693), 5.2% of Peru (1:1,482), 5.1% of Spain (1:2,237), 4.7% of the United States (1:18,710), 2.2% of Ecuador (1:1,738), 2.0% of Cuba (1:1,377), 1.3% of Bolivia (1:1,918) and 1.0% of the Philippines (1:24,752).

In Spain, the frequency of the surname was higher than national average (1:2,237) in the following autonomous communities:
Canary Islands (1:315)
La Rioja (1:1,032)
Andalusia (1:1,316)

In Paraguay, the frequency of the surname was higher than national average (1:227) in the following departments:
Cordillera (1:155)
Paraguarí (1:177)
Caaguazú (1:181)
Ñeembucú (1:205)
Alto Paraguay (1:207)
Central (1:209)
Alto Paraná (1:217)
Amambay (1:226)
Concepción (1:227)

People
Alonso de Ojeda (c. 1465 – 1515), Spanish explorer
Augie Ojeda (born 1974), baseball infielder
Bob Ojeda (born 1957), baseball pitcher
César Raúl Ojeda Zubieta (born 1952), Mexican politician
Eddie Ojeda (born 1955), guitarist of Twisted Sister
Enrique García Ojeda (born 1972), Spanish rally driver
Fabricio Ojeda (1929-1966), Venezuelan guerrilla leader, journalist and politician
Filiberto Ojeda Ríos (1933–2005), Puerto Rican commander-in-chief  of the Boricua Popular Army
J. Enrique Ojeda (born 1928), literary critic, born in Ecuador
Juan Ojeda (born 1982), Argentine footballer
Juan Ojeda (born 1998), Paraguayan footballer
León Fidel Ojeda (born 1967), Colombian politician
Luis Francisco Ojeda (born June 16, 1941), Puerto Rican television host
Manuel Ojeda (born 1940), Mexican actor
Mario Ojeda Gómez (born 1927), Mexican scholar
Miguel Ojeda (born 1975), Mexican baseball catcher
Richard Ojeda (born 1970), American politician and West Virginia state senator; does not use standard Spanish pronunciation of name 
Rosa María Ojeda (born 1986), Mexican model
Santos Ojeda (born 1917), Cuban-American classical pianist
Wilfred Iván Ojeda (1955–2011), Venezuelan journalist and politician

References

Spanish-language surnames
Surnames of Spanish origin